The St. Helena wrasse (Thalassoma sanctahelenae) is a species of marine ray-finned fish, a wrasse from the family Labridae. This poorly known species is endemic to the waters around St. Helena. It is a species associated with reef sand it is found in shallow coastal waters in the vicinity of rocks and rocky reefs.

References

St Helena wrasse
Fish described in 1839
Taxobox binomials not recognized by IUCN